Stampin' Ground was an English metalcore band from Cheltenham, initially active from 1995 to 2006, and again in 2014. The band has toured with the likes of Anthrax, Chimaira, The Haunted, Agnostic Front, Sick of It All, Soulfly, Arch Enemy, and played the main stage at Download Festival 2003.

On 24 February 2014, they were announced to be playing the 2014 UK leg of the Sonisphere festival. They went on to play a string of dates in that year, which would be their last dates for the time being, finishing at Damnation Festival in November of 2014.

Members
Adam Frakes-Sime – vocals (1998–2006, 2014)
Scott Atkins – guitar (1995–2006)
Antony "Mobs" Mowbray – guitar
Ben Frost – bass (2003–2006, 2014)
Neil Hutton – drums (2002–2006)
Ian Glasper – bass (1995–2003)
Adrian "Ade" Stokes – drums (1995–2002)
Heath Crosby – vocals (1995–1997)
Paul Catten – vocals (demos only)

Discography
"Dawn of Night" 7 single (1996)
"Starved" 7" single (1996)
Stampin' Ground mini-CD (1996)
Demons Run Amok (1997)
An Expression of Repressed Violence (1998)
The Darkside Versus the Eastside (split mini-CD with Knuckledust) (1999)
Carved from Empty Words (2000)
Allied Forces (split EP with North Side Kings) (2002)
Trapped in the Teeth of Demons live 10" (limited edition picture disc) (2003)
A New Darkness Upon Us (2003)

References

External links
 Stampin' Ground official Facebook page

English heavy metal musical groups
Groove metal musical groups
Musical groups established in 1995
Musical groups disestablished in 2006